On 24 February 2020, a man rammed his car against civilians at a carnival parade in Volkmarsen, Hesse, Germany, injuring 154 people.

Attack
At about 2:45 p.m., a silver Mercedes car was driven first through plastic barricades set up for the parade and then into a crowd at a carnival parade celebrating Rosenmontag in Volkmarsen, Hesse, Germany. Eye witnesses informed BBC News that the driver sped up to attack the civilians, and seemed to target children. 154 people were injured, with thirty-five seriously injured. Twenty of those injured were children, the youngest of whom was a two-year-old. A 29 year old German citizen, named by Police as "Maurice P", who moved to the local area within the previous 3 years, was detained and arrested on suspicion of attempted homicide, but a motive for the attack has yet to be determined as the suspect was said to not be in a fit state of mind to be questioned. The New York Times reported that once the car initially crashed, bystanders rushed to the car. A woman tried to take the keys from the man, but was choked and had her hair pulled; the suspect tried to restart the car, but three men assaulted the suspect to disable him. As of 24 February, the suspect was receiving medical treatment for injuries sustained in the incident but would later be brought before an investigating judge. Hesse authorities cancelled all carnival parades as a precaution that day, and reconvened them on the following morning with enhanced security.

Investigation
The attacker was identified as Maurice Pahler, a 29-year-old German man known to police for crimes including assault. It was stated by the public prosecutors office that the assault was premeditated. It was initially reported that the attacker was under the effect of alcohol and drugs, but this was later corrected as false.

A person who filmed the attack was arrested; it is not clear if he was involved in the attack.

Responses
Chancellor Angela Merkel said her thoughts were with the injured and their relatives and thanked the police and medical services.

References

2020 road incidents in Europe
2020 crimes in Germany
21st century in Hesse
Attacks in Europe in 2020
Crime in Hesse
February 2020 crimes in Europe
February 2020 events in Germany
Vehicular rampage in Germany
Waldeck-Frankenberg